Agdistis tenera is a moth in the family Pterophoridae. It is known from Iran, Bahrain, the United Arab Emirates and Yemen.

References

Agdistinae
Moths of the Arabian Peninsula
Moths described in 1976